Viešinta is a river of  Anykščiai district municipality, Utena County, northeastern Lithuania. It is a left tributary of the river Lėvuo.

References

Rivers of Lithuania
Anykščiai District Municipality